Opopomoz is a 2003 Italian-French-Spanish animation film directed by Enzo D'Alò. It tells an unusual Christmas story, set in a modern-day Naples, during the Christmas season.

The film was shot in two years, with a budget of about 10 million euro.

Plot
The movie starts in Hell where Satan plans to destroy Christmas by stopping Jesus's birth, and he decides to send three of his minions — Astarotte, Scarapino and Farfaricchio — in Naples from the barrel of Mount Vesuvius since it was the "Crib's capital".  The three devils choose a little kid called Rocco, which is unhappy and jealous for the incoming birth of his little brother Francesco, and he's always angry with his mother and father.

After a lot of tempting, the devils manage to make Rocco say the magic word "Opopomoz" and go into the crib's world, where he's determined to stop Mary and Joseph from coming to Betlem. But the three devils cause a lot of problems and never manage to accomplish the mission, so Rocco runs away.

Meanwhile, his little Italo-American cousin Sara discovers what happened thanks to Rocco's cat and runs after him into the Crib's world, but doesn't manage to find, and she's found by a young Saint Peter and his family. Rocco finally finds Sara who finally convinces him, with the help of an Angel, that he was wrong, so they send away the three devils.

Satan's furious with them and decides to kill Mary by hypnotizing Rocco and devouring Sara's soul, but his spell fails after the boy looked at Mary's aureole and the three devils, who are tired of getting bossed and feel sorry for the little girl, wake her and encourage her to sing a song her grandmother taught her which could send away the devil, and so Satan is sucked back in Hell forever.

Finally, Jesus is born and Rocco's mother gives birth to Francesco right on Christmas's night and the three little devils are turned into an ox and two donkeys to watch over little Jesus.

Voice Cast 

 Tonino Accolla as Astarotte
 Oreste Lionello as Scarapino
 Fabio Volo as Farfaricchio
 John Turturro as John
 Silvio Orlando as Peppino
 Vincenzo Salemme as Joseph

See also
 List of Christmas films

References

Further reading
 Enzo D'Alò, Opopomoz. Il libro del film, Emme Edizioni, 2003. .

External links

2003 films
Italian animated films
2003 animated films
Italian Christmas films
Films set in Naples
Films directed by Enzo D'Alò
Spanish animated films
2000s French animated films
2000s Christmas films
2000s Italian films
Films about the Nativity of Jesus